Rachel Anne Graham (born June 7, 1976) is an American lawyer, currently serving as judge of the Wisconsin Court of Appeals in the Madison-based District IV court.  She was appointed in 2019 by Wisconsin Governor Tony Evers.

Early life and education

Born in Stevens Point, Wisconsin, Graham graduated from Stevens Point Area Senior High School in 1994. After earning her bachelor's degree from Northwestern University in 1998, she went to work for several years as a special education teacher in Baton Rouge, Louisiana, and worked as a curriculum specialist at various education non-profits.

She returned to school to obtain her Juris Doctor from the University of Wisconsin Law School in 2008. During law school, she worked as a student attorney with the Wisconsin Innocence Project and was senior managing editor of the Wisconsin International Law Journal.

Legal career

In 2011, she served as a law clerk to Wisconsin Supreme Court Justice Anne Walsh Bradley. She was clerking for Justice Bradley during the infamous altercation between Bradley and fellow-Justice David Prosser Jr., in which Prosser grabbed Bradley by the neck.  Graham was one of several court staffers interviewed in the investigation and pointed to pressure from the state legislature as having damaged relations between the justices.

Following her clerkship, Graham was hired by the national law firm Quarles & Brady in their Madison office, working in commercial litigation.  While working at Quarles & Brady, she was also volunteering as a commissioner on Wisconsin's National and Community Service Board, having been appointed in 2010.  She remained at Quarles & Brady until her appointment to the Wisconsin Court of Appeals in 2019.

Judicial career

On June 13, 2019, Governor Tony Evers announced the appointment of Graham to the Wisconsin Court of Appeals, to the seat vacated by the retirement of Judge Gary Sherman.  Judge Graham was the first judicial appointment of Tony Evers' governorship.  She won re-election without opposition in the 2020 election.

Electoral history

Wisconsin Appeals Court (2020)

| colspan="6" style="text-align:center;background-color: #e9e9e9;"| General Election, April 7, 2020

References

External links

1976 births
Living people
20th-century American lawyers
21st-century American judges
21st-century American lawyers
20th-century American women lawyers
Northwestern University alumni
People from Stevens Point, Wisconsin
University of Wisconsin Law School alumni
Wisconsin Court of Appeals judges
Wisconsin lawyers
21st-century American women judges